is a dish popular in Japan as a Western-style dish or yōshoku. It usually contains beef, onions, and button mushrooms, in a thick demi-glace sauce which often contains red wine and tomato sauce. This sauce is served atop or alongside steamed rice. The sauce is sometimes topped with a drizzle of fresh cream.

Recipe variants sometimes include soy sauce and sake.

The dish originates from the former mining town of Ikuno, Hyōgo Prefecture, Japan. There was a French engineer who worked for the mine in 1868 and improved it. Hayashi rice demonstrates a Western influence with the use of demi-glace and often red wine, but is unknown in Western countries. In fact, it contains ingredients popular in Japan: slices of beef (Hyōgo Prefecture is also famous for its Kobe beef), rice and demi-glace sauce (among others). It can be compared to another popular dish, the Japanese-style hamburger steak with demi-glace sauce. Another variation is the omuhayashi, a combination of omurice and hayashi rice. It also resembles a Japanese curry and usually appears on menus alongside curry.

There is some debate regarding the origin of the name of this dish:
 Another theory is that the name was produced by a cook named Hayashi who often served this dish for staff meals at the  restaurant.
 Perhaps the most common explanation is that the name (ハヤシ; "hayashi"; "hashed") is simply derived from the English phrase "hashed beef".

Hayashi rice is one of Japan's most popular Western-style dishes. Thanks to the widespread availability of hayashi rice mix (normally sold as roux blocks) and prepared demiglace sauce (normally canned) at Japanese supermarkets, this dish is common household fare. Like Japanese curry, it is usually eaten with a spoon.

Hayashi rice was an important dish in mystery writer Keigo Higashino's novel Ryūsei no Kizuna.

See also
 Demi-glace
 Japanese curry
 Beef bourguignon

References

Beef dishes
Japanese rice dishes
Japanese fusion cuisine
Japanese beef dishes